Brandvlei Correctional Centre (formerly Brandvlei Prison) is a prison situated on the bank of the Brandvlei Dam near Worcester, Western Cape, South Africa. It contains a maximum-security unit, a medium-security unit, and a juvenile unit. The facility also houses members of the notorious The Numbers Gang or numbers gangs. In 2021, it was featured in a Netflix series, Inside the World's Toughest Prisons.

According to the Census of 2001, the population of the prison (including prisoners and resident staff) was 3,020.

References

Prisons in South Africa
Cape Winelands District Municipality